The 1991 Boston Red Sox season was the 91st season in the franchise's Major League Baseball history. The Red Sox finished tied for second in the American League East with a record of 84 wins and 78 losses, seven games behind the Toronto Blue Jays.

Offseason
December 19, 1990: Danny Darwin signed as a free agent with the Red Sox.
February 1, 1991: John Moses was signed as a free agent by the Red Sox.
April 1, 1991: John Moses was released by the Red Sox.

Regular season

Season standings

Record vs. opponents

Notable transactions
 April 18, 1991: Steve Lyons was signed as a free agent by the Red Sox.
August 9, 1991: Kevin Romine was released by the Red Sox.

Opening Day Line Up

Alumni game
The team held an old-timers game on May 11, before a scheduled home game against the Texas Rangers. Festivities included non-playing appearances by Ted Williams (then 72) and Joe DiMaggio (then 76), in recognition of the 50th anniversary of the 1941 MLB season, when Williams batted .406 and DiMaggio had a 56-game hitting streak. Red Sox alumni lost, 9–5, to a team of MLB alumni from other clubs, led by José Cardenal who had three hits (including two doubles) in the three-inning game.

Roster

Statistical leaders 

Source:

Batting 

Source:

Pitching 

Source:

Awards and honors
Awards
Wade Boggs – Silver Slugger Award (3B)
Roger Clemens – American League Cy Young Award, AL Pitcher of the Month (April, September)
 Tony Peña – Gold Glove Award (C)

Accomplishments
Roger Clemens, American League Leader, Games Started (35)
Roger Clemens, American League Leader, Innings Pitched
Roger Clemens, American League Leader, Shutouts (4)

All-Star Game
Wade Boggs, third base, starter
Roger Clemens, pitcher, reserve
Jeff Reardon, relief pitcher, reserve

Farm system

Source:

References

External links
1991 Boston Red Sox team at Baseball-Reference
1991 Boston Red Sox season at baseball-almanac.com

Boston Red Sox seasons
Boston Red Sox
Boston Red Sox
Red Sox